Chromium(II) sulfate refers to inorganic compounds with the chemical formula CrSO4·n H2O. Several closely related hydrated salts are known. The pentahydrate is a blue solid that dissolves readily in water.  Solutions of chromium(II) are easily oxidized by air to Cr(III) species. Solutions of Cr(II) are used as specialized reducing agents of value in organic synthesis.

The salt is produced by treating chromium metal with aqueous sulfuric acid:
Cr  +  H2SO4  +  5 H2O   →   CrSO4·5 H2O + H2
It can be produced through the reaction of sulfate salts and chromium(II) acetate or, for in situ use, the reduction of chromium(III) sulfate with zinc.

Structure
In aqueous solutions chromium(II) sulfate forms metal aquo complexes, presumably with six water ligands. The structures of the crystalline salts are similar to the corresponding hydrates of copper(II) sulfate: pentahydrate, trihydrate, monohydrate, and anhydrous derivatives of chromous sulfate are known.  In all of these compounds, the Cr(II) centre adopts octahedral coordination geometry, being coordinated to six oxygen centers provided by a combination of water and sulfate ligands.

References

Chromium(II) compounds
Sulfates
Chromium–oxygen compounds